Piwonin  is a village in Otwock County, Gmina Sobienie-Jeziory. The  population is near 100. In the village is Voivodship Road 739. From 1975 to 1998 village was in Siedlce Voivodeship.

Villages in Otwock County